Lac d'Alfeld is a lake in Haut-Rhin, France. At an elevation of 620 m, its surface area is 0.1 km².

Alfeld